Verín Club de Fútbol is a Spanish football team based in Verín, in the autonomous community of Galicia. Founded in 1971, it plays in Primeira Autonómica, holding home matches at Campo de Fútbol Xosé Argiz, which has a capacity of 2,000 spectators.

Verín CF is selling an erotic 2013 calendar, available on their Facebook page or via email: (club@verincf.es) to help finance the team.

Season to season

10 seasons in Tercera División

Notable former coaches
 Nikola Spasov

External links
Official website 
Futbolme.com profile 
Verín CF Facebook

Football clubs in Galicia (Spain)
Association football clubs established in 1971
Divisiones Regionales de Fútbol clubs
1971 establishments in Spain